Adam Vlkanova (born 4 September 1994) is a Czech professional footballer who plays as a midfielder for Czech First League club Viktoria Plzeň.

Club career
Vlkanova is a youth product of the academies of Hradec Králové and Olympia Hradec Králové. He began his senior career with Bohemians 1905 in 2013, then in the Czech National Football League. He joined Hradec Králové in the winter of the 2013–14 season, immediately returning to Bohemians for the remainder of the season. In August 2014, he played one game for Čáslav before returning to Hradec Králové. Vlkanova extended his contract with the club in August 2015 for three years, and then in 2019 again extended for three more years until 2022 and being named captain of the club. On 31 August 2022, Vlkanova joined Viktoria Plzeň on a three-year contract.

International career
Vlkanova represented the Czech Republic U21s once in 2016. He was first called up to the senior Czech Republic national team for 2022–23 UEFA Nations League matches in June 2022. He made his debut on 9 June 2022 in a UEFA Nations League game against Portugal.

Personal life
Vlkanova was attacked by an unknown assailant in September 2016 breaking a cervical vertebrae, keeping him out from playing football for a month.

References

External links

 
 FCHK Profile
 Idnes Profile

1994 births
Living people
Sportspeople from Hradec Králové
Czech footballers
Czech Republic under-21 international footballers
Association football midfielders
Bohemians 1905 players
FC Hradec Králové players
FK Čáslav players
Czech First League players
Czech National Football League players
Czech Republic international footballers
FC Viktoria Plzeň players